Jaws of Death is the second album by the German heavy metal band Primal Fear, released in 1999.

Track listing

Additional information
The album was re-issued in 2005 by Nuclear Blast in a multibox containing the 1998 album Primal Fear

Credits
Ralf Scheepers - vocals
Tom Naumann - guitars/keyboards
Stefan Leibing - guitars
Mat Sinner - bass guitar/keyboards/vocals
Klaus Sperling - drums

Production
Mat Sinner - Producer
Stefan Leibing - Engineering
Achim "Akeem" Köhler - Engineering, Mixing, Mastering
Ingmar Schelzel - Engineering (additional)
Mitch Howell - Engineering (additional)
Robert Valdez - Engineering (additional)
Stephan Lohrmann - Cover art
Rainer Ill - Photography
Matthias Moser - Photography
Martin Fust - Photography

1999 albums
Primal Fear (band) albums
Nuclear Blast albums